Archduchess Margaret of Austria (17 August 1925 – 3 May 1979), was an Austrian archduchess of the House of Habsburg-Lorraine as the daughter of Archduke Joseph Francis of Austria and Anna of Saxony. She married an Italian nobleman, Alexander Czech, Prince of Monteleone, and had issue.

Biography

Family 
Archduchess Margaret was born on 17 August 1925 in Budapest, Hungary. She was the eldest child of Archduke Joseph Francis of Austria and his wife, Princess Anna of Saxony. Through her mother, Margaret was a granddaughter of Frederick Augustus III, the last King of Saxony. Her father was from a branch of the House of Habsburg-Lorraine who reigned as Palatines of Hungary on behalf of the king.

She was also often referenced by her nickname, "Margit."

Marriage 
On her eighteenth birthday, Margaret married Alexander Czech, son of General Jószef Cech (1855-1938) and Princess Amalia Erba Odescalchi dei Principi di Monteleone (1889-1969). He had been made Prince of Monteleone by King Victor Emmanuel III of Italy shortly before his marriage. The couple had a daughter named Sibylla, who later succeeded her father as Principesa di Monteleone.

The couple lived in Budapest, where Alexander was a landowner and worked as lawyer. In this capacity, he aided Jews during World War II, for which he would receive the Righteous Among the Nations award in 1999. However in 1945, the threat posed by the Soviet Red Army forced the couple to flee to Sweden with the assistance of Crown Prince Gustaf Adolf. Archduchess Margaret died there on 3 May 1979 at the age of 53.

Ancestry

References

Bibliography 
 
 
 .
 .

1925 births
1979 deaths
House of Habsburg-Lorraine
German royalty
Austrian princesses